is a Philippine-born Japanese professional golfer. She competed for the Philippines through 2021, having won the first ever gold medal for the Philippines in both women's individual and women's team event in Asian Games golf competitions. As of 2022, she is representing Japan.

Early life
Saso was born on June 20, 2001, to a Filipina mother and a Japanese father, hence her Japanese name. She started training in the sport of golf at the age of eight in 2009. She admired Northern Irish golfer Rory McIlroy as a role model and watched video clips of him as a teenager, modeling her game after his style.

Amateur career
At the 2017 PSA Annual Awards, Saso received an award for winning the gold medal at the 2016 World Junior Girls Championship as well as leading the Philippines to victory in the team event. Saso competed at the 2018 Women's Victorian Open as a part of the 2018 Ladies European Tour and finished at 17th position in the women's individual event. 

With Bianca Pagdanganan and Lois Kaye Go, Saso secured an unexpected historic gold medal at the 2018 Asian Games in the women's team event. She also won the women's individual competition, the first Asian Games gold medal for the Philippines in the women's individual event.

Saso also took part in the 2018 Summer Youth Olympics in Buenos Aires, Argentina where she almost won a medal. After the final round of the women's individual competition, two other golfers, Alessia Nobilio of Italy and Emma Spitz of Austria, matched her result of 214 with Kim Grace of Australia winning the gold medal. Saso, Nobilio, and Spitz had to take part in a three-way playoff. Saso narrowly failed to win a medal with Nobilio winning silver and Spitz bronze. Saso also played in the mixed team event pairing with male golfer and compatriot, Carl Jano Corpus.

Saso did not participate in the Southeast Asian Games, opting to skip the regional games due to conflicting schedule in both the 2017 and 2019 editions.

Saso is one of the three Filipino golfers who competed at the 2020 Summer Olympics in Tokyo, Japan. She finished 9th in the women’s individual event.

Professional career

Saso turned professional in November 2019 after earning a LPGA of Japan Tour card for 2020. In late June 2020, she made her debut at the Earth Mondahmin Cup in Chiba where she placed fifth.

Saso earned her first victory at the 2020 NEC Karuizawa 72. She then won the next event, the Nitori Ladies Golf Tournament. On June 6, 2021, she won the 2021 U.S. Women's Open in a playoff against Nasa Hataoka, her first major title, becoming the first Filipino to win the tournament. Saso, at age 19 years, 11 months, 17 days, matched Inbee Park (2008 U.S. Women's Open champion) as the youngest golfer to win the tournament.

Starting the 2022 LPGA Tour, Saso would be representing Japan following her decision to keep her Japanese citizenship as per Japanese law on dual nationality.

Citizenship
Saso held both Japanese and Filipino citizenship but was obliged to renounce one of her two citizenships by the time she turns 22 years old in 2023 as per Japanese nationality law. In November 2021, Saso announced her intention to keep her Japanese citizenship. She had completed the process by January 2022.

Saso has represented the Philippines in international golf competitions until 2021 but started officially competing for Japan in 2022. Saso, however, feels connection to both her Filipino and Japanese heritage.

Amateur wins
2014 Sabah International Junior Masters, Visayas Regional Amateur and ALM Tournament
2015 Kartini Cup
2016 Philippine Junior Amateur, Philippine Junior Amateur Match Play, World Junior Girls Championship
2017 Philippine Amateur Open Championship, Philippine Junior Amateur, Philippine Amateur Open Match Play Championship
2018 Philippine Ladies Open, Victorian Junior Masters, Thunderbird International Junior, Asian Games (women's individual)
2019 Philippine Ladies Open, Girl's Junior PGA Championship

Source:

Professional wins (3)

LPGA Tour wins (1)

LPGA Tour playoff record (1–0)

LPGA of Japan Tour wins (2)

Major championships

Wins (1)

1 Defeated Hataoka in a two-hole aggregate playoff, followed by a sudden-death playoff: Saso (4-4-3=11) and Hataoka (4-4-4=12 	)

Results timeline

CUT = missed the half-way cut
NT = no tournament
T = tied

LPGA Tour career summary

^ Official as of 6 October 2022 
^Includes matchplay and other tournaments without a cut.

World ranking
Position in Women's World Golf Rankings at the end of each calendar year.

^ as of 6 March 2023

Team appearances
Patsy Hankins Trophy (representing Asia/Pacific): 2018 (winners)
Asian Games (representing the Philippines): 2018 (winners)
Source:

Awards 
 PSA Athlete of the Year, 2018 and 2020

References

External links

Filipino female golfers
Japanese female golfers
LPGA of Japan Tour golfers
LPGA Tour golfers
Winners of LPGA major golf championships
Olympic golfers of the Philippines
Golfers at the 2020 Summer Olympics
Golfers at the 2018 Asian Games
Asian Games gold medalists for the Philippines
Asian Games medalists in golf
Medalists at the 2018 Asian Games
Golfers at the 2018 Summer Youth Olympics
Sportspeople from Bulacan
Tagalog people
Filipino people of Japanese descent
2001 births
Living people